Kweon Young-jun (born March 29, 1987) is a South Korean right-handed épée fencer and 2021 team Olympic bronze medalist.

Medal Record

Olympic Games

World Championship

Asian Championship

Grand Prix

References

External links
 

South Korean male épée fencers
Olympic fencers of South Korea
Fencers at the 2020 Summer Olympics
Asian Games competitors for South Korea
Fencers at the 2018 Asian Games
Fencers at the 2014 Asian Games
Medalists at the 2018 Asian Games
Medalists at the 2014 Asian Games
Asian Games medalists in fencing
Asian Games bronze medalists for South Korea
Asian Games gold medalists for South Korea
Korea National Sport University alumni
People from Cheongju
1987 births
Living people
Medalists at the 2020 Summer Olympics
Olympic medalists in fencing
Olympic bronze medalists for South Korea
Sportspeople from North Chungcheong Province
21st-century South Korean people